Roland Wheatley (20 June 1924 – 27 July 2003) was an English professional footballer who played as a wing half.

References

External links

1924 births
2003 deaths
Footballers from Nottingham
English footballers
Association football wing halves
Beeston Boys Club F.C. players
Nottingham Forest F.C. players
Southampton F.C. players
Grimsby Town F.C. players
Halifax Town A.F.C. players
Workington A.F.C. players
Corby Town F.C. players
Stamford A.F.C. players
English Football League players